Phylladothrips is a genus of thrips in the family Phlaeothripidae.

Species
 Phylladothrips bispinosus
 Phylladothrips fasciae
 Phylladothrips gracilis
 Phylladothrips karnyi
 Phylladothrips lateralis
 Phylladothrips niger
 Phylladothrips pallidus
 Phylladothrips pictus
 Phylladothrips similis

References

Phlaeothripidae
Thrips
Thrips genera